Manjot Singh (born 2 October 1987) is an Australian cricketer. He played two first-class matches for New South Wales in 2013/14.

See also
 List of New South Wales representative cricketers

References

External links
 

1987 births
Living people
Australian cricketers
New South Wales cricketers
Cricketers from Sydney